Samuel Crouser (born December 31, 1991) is an American javelin thrower. He is a 2015 alumnus of the University of Oregon.

High school career
While a senior at Gresham High School, Crouser was named Gatorade High School Track and Field Athlete of the Year in 2010.  He was also Track and Field News "High School Athlete of the Year."  On May 1, 2010, he set the national high school record at 244' 2" (74.42m).  This was broken in 2012 by Billy Stanley of South Park, PA. Sam Crouser set American youth record in Gresham, Oregon on 27 June 2010.

Collegiate career
While a senior at University of Oregon, Samuel Crouser won his second national title at 2015 NCAA Division I Outdoor Track and Field Championships. Samuel Crouser won all four Pac-12 Conference Javelin titles (2012, 13, 14, 15).

Professional career

He competed javelin at the 2012 Olympic Trials in Eugene, Oregon.  He was ranked #6 in the US three years in a row, 2012 to 2014.

Sam placed 31st in Javelin at 2015 IAAF World Championships in Athletics.

Seasonal bests by year
2007 - 67.18
2009 - 72.82
2010 - 77.84
2012 - 80.80	
2013 - 78.53
2014 - 76.98	
2015 - 83.33	
2016 - 78.06

Personal life
His uncle Brian Crouser competed in the javelin throw at the 1988 and 1992 Summer Olympics.  In 2011, cousin Ryan Crouser joined Sam, setting the national high school record in the discus throw for cross town rival Sam Barlow High School.  Ryan went on to win the Olympic Gold Medal in the shot put.  Then in 2012, sister Haley completed the family trifecta by setting the national high school record in the girl's javelin throw.

References

External links

Oregon Ducks bio
Sam Crouser facebook page

1991 births
Living people
Sportspeople from Gresham, Oregon
American male javelin throwers
Oregon Ducks men's track and field athletes
Gresham High School (Oregon) alumni
World Athletics Championships athletes for the United States
Athletes (track and field) at the 2016 Summer Olympics
Olympic track and field athletes of the United States